Shaun Herman Weiss is an American actor, writer, and stand-up comedian well known for his roles in The Mighty Ducks movies.

Early life 
Weiss was born and raised in Montvale, New Jersey, and attended Pascack Hills High School. He is of Jewish descent.

Career 
Weiss started his acting career as Elvis on Pee-wee's Playhouse, but his breakout role came when he earned the part of Greg Goldberg in The Mighty Ducks films. Weiss was originally supposed to play Atuk the Eskimo in the first Mighty Ducks movie and had one line, but his role was expanded. After the first two Mighty Ducks movies, he appeared as Josh Birnbaum in the Disney film Heavyweights. He also appeared in a recurring role as peripheral freak "Sean" on the short-lived NBC dramedy Freaks and Geeks, as well as cameo appearances on The King of Queens. He appeared in commercials for Captain Morgan, Castrol, Verizon Communications, and Mobile ESPN. Weiss appeared in the movie Drillbit Taylor, making an appearance as the school bus driver around the beginning of the film. In 2022, it was announced that he would appear in the film Jesus Revolution, his first film in 14 years. On April 29, 2022, Weiss opened for Russell Peters at Oxnard Levity Live Improv. In 2023, he introduced his own website, shaunweiss.com, where merchandise can be purchased, Podcasts appears can be booked, and upcoming tour dates can be viewed for his stand-up comedy act, The Mighty Weiss Tour 2023.

Personal life 

In July 2017, Weiss was sentenced to 150 days in the Los Angeles County Jail for petty theft. He served just 12 days in jail due to overcrowding. Five days after his release, Weiss was arrested on August 2, 2017, for possession of a controlled substance, methamphetamine, in Burbank, California and was sentenced to 90 days in jail.

As of January 2023, Weiss graduated drug court and is three years sober.

Filmography

References

External links

Date of birth missing (living people)
Male actors from New Jersey
American male child actors
American male film actors
American male television actors
Jewish American male actors
Living people
Pascack Hills High School alumni
People from Montvale, New Jersey